Grand Sierra Resort (formerly MGM Grand Reno, Bally's Reno and Reno Hilton) is a hotel and casino located approximately three miles east of Downtown Reno, Nevada. The hotel has 1,990 guest rooms and suites, 27 floors, 12 restaurants, including Charlie Palmer Steak by celebrity chef Charlie Palmer, and a casino with 80,000 sq ft of space. GSR has a movie theater, a Race & Sports Book, nightclubs including LEX Nightclub, a 25,000 sq ft venue with a swimming pool, lake golf driving range, a two screen cinema, an RV park and a recently opened ice rink. It is owned and operated by Southern California based investment group headed by The Meruelo Group.

History

MGM Grand (1978–1986)
In 1975, officials from the Metro-Goldwyn Mayer Company began to scout out Reno locations for their proposed high rise hotel-casino they wanted to model after their very high-profile Las Vegas casino, the MGM Grand. Following a deal with and approval from the City Council, MGM purchased land between Mill and 2nd Streets, at that time a gravel pit. The Summer of 1976 saw construction begin on the 26 story, 1,015 room property that would then be one of the largest in the world. After two years of fast-tracked construction, the building opened with fanfare, fashion and media attention on May 3, 1978.

In the Summer of 1981, MGM opened an expansion of the hotel with a 26-story wing plus an additional 900 rooms, making a total of 2,001 rooms and suites. Three years later in November 1984 MGM revealed plans to expand the Reno hotel further: a $60 million 26 story wing with another 954 rooms, which never materialized. After fights and issues with the City Council, the expansion was later approved on September 23, 1985, amid rumors the MGM would be sold. Less than five months later on November 16, 1985 those rumors proved to be true with Bally Manufacturing announcing that it would acquire the Reno and Las Vegas MGM's for $440 million, further questioning the newly approved expansion for Reno.

Bally's (1986–1992)

The increased purchase price transaction was completed in April 1986 and MGM Grand Reno became Bally's Reno, the price to purchase the MGM assets came out being more than $550 million. The expansion for Reno was delayed indefinitely leaving the current structure with 2,001 rooms. On April 18, 1989, Bally's shut down the popular Donn Arden production "Hello Hollywood Hello" that was created for the MGM Reno. It closed after 11 years and performances in front of more than 7 million people. It remains still the longest-running production show to ever play in Reno. In 1990 Wall-Street began to tout financial problems with Bally Manufacturing; but in July 1990, they refute the claim and announce they will continue to operate the hotel-casinos.  Three months later in October 1990, it became known that Bally's was struggling with $1.8 billion in debts and announced a plan to restructure and reorganize to keep Bally's Reno operating. After two years of sluggish operations, on February 27, 1992, Bally Manufacturing, parent company of Bally's, filed for bankruptcy. In March, the hotel was placed on the market in an attempt to aid their debt by unloading the non-revenue producing Bally's Reno, sister hotel Bally's Las Vegas was far more superior in terms of revenues. Quickly, bidding began between Hilton Hotels Inc and Harveys Casino. The bidding went on until June 1992 when Hilton put an end to the fight, bidding $83 million. The transaction took a few weeks to complete.

Reno Hilton (1992–2006)

On July 31, 1992, Bally's Reno became officially the Reno Hilton.

Free of financial problems and immediately after the sale, Hilton began investing $86 million worth of renovations in 1994/1995 to transform completely the interior and exterior of the hotel and direct the theme towards a more Western image. In December 1993, during the renovations, Hilton confirmed that it was looking into building a 1,000 room addition. The Reno Hilton's ownership was a series of managers and company names; it was Hilton Hotel Inc. from 1992-1999 when Hilton spun off its gaming operations into a separate company called Park Place Entertainment. Then in 2003, following a 2001 purchase of Caesars World, Park Place changed its name to Caesars Entertainment, with Hilton still holding an affiliation with the company. Around this time, the Reno Hilton was again being renovated. In May 2005, it became known that Caesars Entertainment, which was pending in a merger with Harrah's Entertainment, had to disassociate all hotels under the Hilton brand as Hilton had removed itself from the company and did not want to become part of the merger. Consequently, the property was placed on the market and quickly picked up by a group of investors known as the Grand Sierra Resort Corp. The purchase price was $151 million.

The transaction from Caesars Entertainment to GSR Corp involving the $151 million sale of the Reno Hilton was lengthy. The sale was announced in early May 2005 but wasn't completed until June 2006 due to finance and licensing problems.

Grand Sierra Resort (2006–present)

After all problems were addressed with all parties involved, the Reno Hilton became the Grand Sierra Resort and Casino on June 24, 2006.

During the first ownership of the Grand Sierra Resort nearly $100 million was spent to convert the property into the new brand. The money was spent on reconfiguration of the public areas, a new swimming pool area, update for the casino that included keeping the original MGM-like ceilings, a refreshed hotel lobby and converting floors 17–27 into "hotel-condos" called The Summit. The company had larger-scale expansion plans that included a water park, boutique shopping, a water and laser show, 48-story condominium high-rises and further renovations. Those never came to fruition. Briefly, the hotel was home to Nikki Beach nightlife and Ashton Kutcher's Dolce Enoteca restaurant. In October 2008, in the midst of the economic crises, GSR's ownership or group of investors failed to make payments on their loans with their financier, JPMorgan, essentially bankrupt, the bank foreclosed on the 2,001 room hotel/casino and assumed ownership, assigning it to their affiliate Credit Markets Real Estate Holdings to oversee operations. That affiliate brought on Las Vegas-based management companies such as Catalyst, who flips struggling hotel/casinos and makes them attractive to a buyer. Those companies, including the Navengante Group and Santo Gaming, both Las Vegas based, continued to make improvements to the resort such as adding or replacing restaurants. The hotel/condo program was eliminated and settlements with buyers are ongoing to this day, the renovated rooms above the 17th floor that are non-private owned rent as hotel rooms.

In 2009, The Meruelo Group began looking at the property with an interest to purchase it. CEO Alex Meruelo was intrigued by the property's potential to truly become an elite destination resort. After negotiations between Meruelo and JPMorgan, a deal was reached to sell the 145-acre site for only $42 million. This payment was made in cash, and the deal was announced in February 2011. Quickly, the deal closed after regulatory approval in April 2011. Out of bank ownership, Meruelo pledged to continually make improvements. Not gamers, Meruelo, owner of successful restaurant chains, TV stations and construction companies, was now in the business of hotel/casinos. He brought on seasoned management from Las Vegas to help in his effort to rebrand the property. In August 2011, the company announced a multi-phase $25 million improvement program that would renovate the casino, hotel lobby, rooms and restaurants. In August 2012, that program was completed. Favoring bright and modern versus elegant and dark. Even with the first round of renovations completed, Meruelo was not stopping their improvements with renovations to their sports book, a new Spa, new stores and a $14 million nightclub opened in 2014. For the first time in the property's 30-year history, exterior enhancements were made in 2014. Another renovation for the meeting space occurred in the summer of 2015.

Attractions

Casino
Grand Sierra has the largest casino floor in Reno and Northern Nevada with over 80,000 square feet of slots, video poker, table games and a race and sports book. It has been recently renovated with new carpet, table game decor, slot chairs and new lighting.

Grand Sierra Cinema
Grand Sierra Cinema is a two auditorium theater located in the lower level mall. The theater features movies that recently left mainstream theaters but haven't yet reached DVD for just $5. Movies are played once on weeknights and twice on weekend nights.

Fun Quest
Fun Quest is the resort's family entertainment center. Attractions in the FEC include a Laser Tag arena.

Grand Adventure Land
Grand Adventure Land is located at the northwest corner of the resort's property. Essentially a miniature amusement park featuring upcharge attractions, the park contains a 180-foot Skycoaster, and three go-cart tracks.

Grand Bay Driving Range 
Grand Bay Driving Range is located at the southeast corner of the resort property along the north shore of the Grand Bay. The outdoor range features eight island greens, each varying in distance and difficulty, dotted along a large body of water.

Grand Theatre
A 2,995-seat concert and show venue, the renovated historic Grand Theatre is home to the world's largest indoor stage with more than a full acre of usable space. The theater was constructed to host MGM's "Hello Hollywood Hello" Production from 1978 to 1987. The Meruelo Group remodeled the Grand Theatre at Grand Sierra Resort. The Miss USA 2019 competition was held here in 2019, and again in 2022, being renewed on a three year contract, thus hosting Miss USA 2022, 2023, and 2024.

Events 
The Grand Sierra is home to the local furry convention, aptly named Biggest Little Fur Con, since its inception in 2013.

References

 

1978 establishments in Nevada
Buildings and structures completed in 1978
Buildings and structures completed in 1981
Hotel buildings completed in 1978
Hotels established in 1978
Casinos in Reno, Nevada
Hotels in Reno, Nevada
Resorts in Nevada
Casino hotels
Skyscrapers in Nevada
Skyscraper hotels in Nevada